Hot Pepper may refer to:

Hot Pepper (1933 film) directed by John G. Blystone
Hot Pepper (1973 film) by Les Blank
Chili pepper, fruits of plants of the genus Capsicum